Leonidas Andrianopoulos (10 August 1911 – 25 October 2011) was a Greek footballer who played as a striker.

Career
Andrianopoulos played club football for Olympiacos,  alongside his four older brothers Yiannis, Dinos, Giorgos and Vassilis. Following his death, club president Evangelos Marinakis described him as a "legend."

He also earned eleven international caps for Greece, scoring two goals.

Death
Andrianopoulos died on 25 October 2011, at the age of 100.

References

1911 births
2011 deaths
Greek footballers
Greece international footballers
Olympiacos F.C. players
Greek centenarians
Men centenarians
Footballers from Piraeus
Association football forwards